Anterior lingual glands (also called apical glands) are deeply placed seromucous glands that are located near the tip of the tongue on each side of the frenulum linguae. They are found on the under surface of the apex of the tongue, and are covered by a bundle of muscular fibers derived from the Styloglossus and Longitudinalis inferior.

The anterior lingual glands are sometimes referred by eponymous names such as:
 Bauhin's glands: Named after Swiss anatomist Gaspard Bauhin (1560–1624).
 Blandin's glands: Named after French surgeon Philippe-Frédéric Blandin (1798-1849).
 Nuhn's glands: Named after German anatomist Anton Nuhn (1815–1889).

These glands are present in the large apes but not in the small apes like gibbons and represent an evolutionary divergence.

References

 Mondofacto Dictionary (definition of eponym)
 This article was originally based on an entry from a public domain edition of Gray's Anatomy. As such, some of the information contained herein may be outdated. Please edit the article if this is the case, and feel free to remove this notice when it is no longer relevant.

Anterior lingual glands